St Mark's Cathedral, Luweero is a cathedral of the Church of Uganda (Anglican) in Luweero, Central Region, Uganda. It is the seat of the bishop of Luweero, currently Eridard Kironde Nsubuga

References

Anglican cathedrals in Uganda